Mark Lamont (born 4 February 1993) is a Scottish footballer who last played for Dumbarton. He previously played for St Mirren, Dumbarton, Petershill, Stirling Albion, East Fife and Stranraer. Lamont, who is a midfielder, has also played for his country at youth international level.

Career

St Mirren
Lamont who was born in Paisley, Scotland started his career as part of St Mirren's under-19 squad. He made senior debut on 26 February 2011 as a substitute for Craig Dargo in 2–0 defeat against Kilmarnock in a Scottish Premier League fixture. Soon after his debut he was selected for a Scotland Under-19 squad. Lamont was sent on loan to Dumbarton on the opening day of 2012 winter transfer window to gain more first team experience following an ankle injury he had sustained from the previous season. Having returned from his loan spell with Dumbarton he signed a new contract with St Mirren keeping him at the club until January 2013, before being loaned out again. He returned from his loan on 3 January 2013 and was subsequently released by his parent club.

Dumbarton
On 1 January 2012, he joined Scottish Second Division side Dumbarton until the end of the 2011–12 season. He made his debut for Dumbarton the following day in 3–2 victory against Arbroath. Lamont suffered an achilles injury in early March against Cowdenbeath. Despite manager Alan Adamson ruling him for rest of the season, he returned for the Scottish First Division play-off final first leg. He played again in the second leg, with Dumbarton securing promotion 6–2 on aggregate. Lamont rejoined the now First Division side, on loan at the start of the 2012–13 season. His loan expired in January and he returned to St Mirren whom released him. After becoming a free agent he rejoined Dumbarton on a permanent basis becoming Ian Murray's third signing as manager. Lamont would continue to have injury struggles. Having procured a seventh-place finish with Dumbarton in First Division, Lamont was released and later retired.

Lamont made a trial appearance for Albion Rovers in March 2014 and went on to join Junior side Petershill in the summer of that year.

Stirling Albion, East Fife and Stranraer
On 15 September 2015, after having spent 2 years away from professional football Lamont signed for Scottish League Two club Stirling Albion, having already played for the side as a trialist against East Stirlingshire. On 5 December 2015 Lamont scored a goal in a match against Elgin City. This made the score 1–1 in a match that Stirling Albion went on to win. He was released at the end of the 2015–16 season and subsequently signed for East Fife in June 2016. After two seasons at East Fife he joined Stranraer.

Dumbarton return 
After two years out of football, Lamont returned to Dumbarton in July 2021 - linking up with former boss at Stranraer, Stephen Farrell. However he made just one appearance for the club, as a substitute against Partick Thistle, before stepping away from football and leaving the club permanently in May 2022.

Kilwinning Rangers
A month later, Lamont signed a one-year deal with West of Scotland Football League side Kilwinning Rangers.

International career
Lamont has represented Scotland at Under-19 level on two occasions both of which were against Denmark.

Career statistics

Notes

References

External links

1993 births
Living people
Footballers from Paisley, Renfrewshire
Association football midfielders
Scottish footballers
Scotland youth international footballers
St Mirren F.C. players
Dumbarton F.C. players
Albion Rovers F.C. players
Petershill F.C. players
Stirling Albion F.C. players
East Fife F.C. players
Scottish Premier League players
Scottish Football League players
Scottish Professional Football League players
Scottish Junior Football Association players
Stranraer F.C. players